Pascal Légitimus (born 13 March 1959) is a French actor, comedian and theatre director. He is a member of the famous French humour band Les Inconnus.

Personal life
He is the son of an Armenian theater seamstress, Madeleine Kambourian, and of an Antillean actor, Théo Légitimus.
He is also the grandson of Martinican comedian Darling Légitimus and the nephew of television producer Gésip Légitimus.

Theatre

Actor

Director

Filmography

Dubbing

References

External links

 

1959 births
Living people
French comedians
French people of Armenian descent
French people of Martiniquais descent
Male actors from Paris
French male film actors
French male television actors
French male video game actors
French male stage actors
French male writers
20th-century French male actors
21st-century French male actors
Theatre directors from Paris